The 1953 Marquette Hilltoppers football team was an American football team that represented Marquette University as an independent during the 1953 college football season. In its fourth season under head coach Lisle Blackbourn, the team compiled a 6–3–1 record and outscored all opponents by a total of 196 to 108. The team played its home games at Marquette Stadium in Milwaukee.

Schedule

References

Marquette
Marquette Golden Avalanche football seasons
Marquette Hilltoppers football